The 1932 Spring Hill Badgers football team was an American football team that represented Spring Hill College as a member of the Dixie Conference during the 1932 college football season. In their second year under head coach Pat Browne, the team compiled a 0–7 record.

Schedule

References

Spring Hill
Spring Hill Badgers football seasons
College football winless seasons
Spring Hill Badgers football